Yellowstone Regional Airport  is a public-use airport located two nautical miles (3.7 km) southeast of the central business district of Cody, a city in Park County, Wyoming, United States. It is the only commercial airport in Park County Wyoming. It is in northwestern Wyoming, about 53 miles from the east entrance of Yellowstone National Park.

The airport is owned by the city of Cody and is operated by the Yellowstone Regional Airport Joint Powers Board. This board was established in 1981 and is made up of seven members appointed by the Cody City Council and the Park County Commission. The daily operations of the airport are overseen by an Airport Manager, who is appointed by the board.

It should not be confused with Yellowstone Airport, located 104 miles (167 km) west in West Yellowstone, Montana, near the west entrance to Yellowstone National Park, or Bozeman Yellowstone International Airport, located 136 miles (219 km) northwest in Belgrade, Montana, on the outskirts of Bozeman.

Facilities and aircraft
It has one runway designated 4/22 with an asphalt surface measuring 8,268 by 100 feet (2,520 x 30 m).

For the 12-month period ending December 31, 2018, the airport had 29,345 aircraft operations, an average of 80 per day: 93% general aviation, 7% air taxi, and <1% military. At that time there were 82 aircraft based at this airport: 83% single-engine, 7% multi-engine, 7% jet, and 2% helicopter, plus 1 glider and 1 ultralight.

A new $12.5 million airport terminal opened in December 2010. 95% of the cost for the new terminal was paid with an FAA grant, 3% from the Wyoming State Aeronautics Division and the remaining 2% from the airport itself.

Choice Aviation, the airport's fixed-base operator (FBO), offers fuel, flight instruction, aircraft/hangar rental, and other services.

Airline and destination

Passenger

Statistics

Top destinations

Cargo airlines
FedEx Express and UPS Airlines both offer frequent air cargo services at the airport.

Ground transportation
Budget, Hertz, and Thrifty all offer rental cars at the airport.

Passenger services
Yellowstone Regional Airport offers free Wi-Fi Internet service in its terminal. Food and beverage service is available at a restaurant at the airport.

References

External links
 Yellowstone Regional Airport 
 Aerial image as of August 1994 from USGS The National Map
 

Airports in Wyoming
Buildings and structures in Park County, Wyoming
Transportation in Park County, Wyoming
Essential Air Service